The land districts of New Zealand are the cadastral divisions of New Zealand, which are used on property titles. There are 12 districts, six in the North Island and six in the South Island. The land districts are distinct from the 16 local government regions. The current legislation for the land districts is the Land Transfer Act 1952.

North Island districts

North Auckland Land District – includes the Northland and Auckland regions
South Auckland Land District – most of the Waikato region, and some of the Bay of Plenty region
Gisborne Land District – similar area to the Gisborne Region
Taranaki Land District – similar area to the Taranaki region
Hawke's Bay Land District – similar area to the Hawke's Bay region
Wellington Land District – includes the Wellington region and much of the Manawatū-Whanganui region

South Island districts

Nelson Land District – includes Nelson, Tasman and the northern part of the West Coast region
Marlborough Land District – similar area to the Marlborough region
Westland Land District – the south and central parts of the West Coast region
Canterbury Land District – similar area to the Canterbury region
Otago Land District – similar area to the Otago region
Southland Land District – similar area to the Southland region

See also
Surveying in New Zealand

References

Land surveying systems
Subdivisions of New Zealand